

2020 XR is an Apollo near-Earth object and potentially hazardous asteroid roughly  in diameter. With a 5-day observation arc it was briefly listed as having a 1 in 11,000 chance of impacting Earth on 1 December 2028 placing it at the top of the Sentry Risk Table with a Palermo scale rating of -0.70.

Discovery 
It came to perihelion on 8 December 2020. On 2 January 2021, it passed  from Earth.

On 13 December 2020, precovery observations from 2013, 2016, and mid-2020 extended the observation arc from 8 days to 7.8 years allowing the asteroid to be removed from the Sentry Risk Table.

2024 
It was the Earth perturbations of the asteroid in 2024 that determined if an impact was possible in December 2028. On 4 December 2024, the asteroid will pass  from Earth with an uncertainty region of about ±800 km. This will increase the asteroid's orbital period by 10 days.

2028 
On 7 November 2028, the asteroid will pass  from Earth. By 1 December 2028 the asteroid will be  from Earth with an uncertainty region of about ±10,000 km.

Notes

References

External links 
 Asteroid Hazards, Part 3: Finding the Path – YouTube video by the Minor Planet Center (26 August 2015)
 
 
 

Minor planet object articles (unnumbered)

20210102
20201204